Maïlys Dhia Traoré, (born 8 July 1995 in Saint-Affrique) is a French international rugby union player. She plays the position of prop with Stade Toulousain and for the France team since 2014.

She competed at the 2017 Women's Rugby World Cup, and 2020 Women's Six Nations Championship .

She played for Stade Toulousain, French champions in 2022, and runner up in 2018 and 2019.

References 

Living people
1995 births
French rugby union players